Mistahi Wasahk 209 is an Indian reserve of the Peter Ballantyne Cree Nation in Saskatchewan. It is adjacent to and east of Southend 200.

References

Indian reserves in Saskatchewan
Division No. 18, Saskatchewan
Peter Ballantyne Cree Nation